Charis Mullen (born 20 February 1974) is an Australian politician. She has been the Labor member for Jordan in the Queensland Legislative Assembly since 2017.

References

Parliamentary Profile

1974 births
Living people
Members of the Queensland Legislative Assembly
Australian Labor Party members of the Parliament of Queensland
Place of birth missing (living people)
Women members of the Queensland Legislative Assembly
People educated at Brisbane State High School
21st-century Australian politicians
21st-century Australian women politicians
Labor Right politicians